Man from the Equator (also known as The Equator Man) is a 2012 South Korean television series, starring Uhm Tae-woong, Lee Joon-hyuk, Lee Bo-young and Im Jung-eun. A tense, emotionally charged tale of brotherhood and betrayal, it follows two best friends with a tragic, twisted history that follows them from youth to adulthood. It aired on KBS2 from March 21 to May 24, 2012 on Wednesdays and Thursdays at 21:55 (KST) for 20 episodes.

After premiering in last place among its more high-profile competitors The King 2 Hearts and Rooftop Prince, the viewership ratings for Man from the Equator steadily climbed due in large part to Uhm Tae-woong's praise-worthy acting and the well-combined plot of romance, fate, revenge and success. Out of a total of 20 episodes, 16 rated number one in its timeslot.

Plot
One the driven top student and the other a happy-go-lucky troublemaker, Jang-il (Siwan) and Sun-woo (Lee Hyun-woo) become unlikely buddies in high school, both poor but proud in their own ways. Their fathers both have ties to a powerful businessman who orders Jang-il's father to kill Sun-woo's father. One desperate crime begets another, and the boys' friendship derails in a shocking betrayal. The attack leaves Sun-woo blind and in a coma. Thirteen years later, their fates will come to a head when they meet again as adults. Jang-il (Lee Joon-hyuk) has become a prosecutor haunted by his past, while Sun-woo (Uhm Tae-woong), the young CEO of investment trust company Royal Tree, is plotting his revenge. Their fates are intertwined with the women they love—Ji-won (Lee Bo-young), a volunteer reader for visually impaired people who now works as a VIP party planner at a five-star hotel, and Soo-mi (Im Jung-eun), a hyper-realism painter. As Jang-il and Sun-woo vow to destroy each other, the truth unravels in a harrowing cycle of deception and revenge as the crimes and secrets of yesteryear come to light.

Cast
Uhm Tae-woong as Kim Sun-woo
Lee Hyun-woo as teenage Sun-woo
Formerly a problem child with a penchant for getting into fist fights, Sun-woo discovers his new-found passion for learning after he befriends top student Jang-il. One day, Kyung-pil, whom he looked up to as a father, dies mysteriously. While trying to discover the truth behind his death, Sun-woo gets into a fatal accident. Years later, he establishes himself as a successful businessman. His new goal now is to solve the mystery behind Kyung-pil's death while coming face to face with his former childhood best friend and nemesis, Jang-il. 
Lee Joon-hyuk as Lee Jang-il
Im Si-wan as teenage Jang-il
Jang-il is from a poor family and grew up in the countryside. From a young age, he excelled in his academic studies, dreaming of one day making it in the real world. His efforts pay off and he becomes a celebrated public prosecutor. Jang-il's greed and ambition for fame and fortune makes him betray his childhood best friend Sun-woo, and he must now live with his dark and lonely secret.
Lee Bo-young as Han Ji-won  
Kyung Soo-jin as young Ji-won
Im Jung-eun as Choi Soo-mi 
Park Se-young as young Soo-mi
Kim Yeong-cheol as Jin No-shik 
Sun-woo's biological father
Lee Won-jong as Lee Yong-bae
Lee Jae-yong as Choi Kwang-chun
Lee Dae-yeon as Kim Kyung-pil 	
Sun-woo's adoptive father, a timid but kind man.
Cha Hwa-yeon as Ma Hee-jung
Lee Seung-hyung as Department head Cha
Jeong Ho-bin as Moon Tae-joo
Kim Soo-hyun as Mr. Koon
Kang Ji-sub as Prosecutor Choi Yoon-suk
Kim Hye-eun as Park Yoon-joo
Park Hyo-jun as Geumjool
Lee Chan-ho as teenage Geumjool

Ratings
In the table below, the blue numbers represent the lowest ratings and the red numbers represent the highest ratings.

Awards and nominations

References

External links
  
 
 

2012 South Korean television series debuts
2012 South Korean television series endings
Korean Broadcasting System television dramas
Korean-language television shows
South Korean melodrama television series
Television series by Pan Entertainment